The 2017–18 Senior Women's National Football Championship is the 23rd edition of the Senior Women's National Football Championship, the premier competition in India for women's teams representing regional and state football associations.

Manipur are currently the defending champions, having defeated Railways in the final during the 2016–17 edition of the tournament. The tournament is being hosted in Odisha and is running from 28 January to 14 February 2018 at the Barabati Stadium.

Tamil Nadu won the championship beating Manipur 2–1 in the final. Indumathi Kathiresan was adjudged both Player of Final and Player of the Tournament.

Format
The 29 teams in the tournament are split into 8 groups of 2–4 teams each. On 9 February and 10 February, there will be four quarter-final matches and on 12 February there will be two semi-final matches. The Final itself will occur on 14 February.

Round dates
The schedule will be follows.

Group stage

Group A

Group B

Group C

Group D

Group E

Group F

Group G

Group H

Bracket

Quarter-finals
*Quarter-finals were played on 9 and 10 February 2018.

Semi-finals
*Semi-finals were played on 12 February 2018.

Final

References

External links
 Senior Women's National Football Championship on the All India Football Federation website.

Senior Women's National Football Championship
2017–18 in Indian football